Gabriel Turbay (1901–1947) was a Colombian politician of Syrian descent. He was a Congressman, Senator, and Foreign Minister in the 1930s. He served as Colombia's Ambassador to the United States from 1939 to 1945. He was an unsuccessful candidate for president in 1946.

Early life
Gabriel Turbay was born on January 10, 1901, in Bucaramanga, Colombia. His parents, Juan Turbay and Barbara Abunader, were immigrants to Colombia from Lebanon.

Turbay earned a PhD in Medicine and Surgery from the National University of Colombia.

Career
Turbay began his career as a physician in his hometown of Bucaramanga.

Turbay joined the Colombian Liberal Party. He served as a member of the House of Representatives from 1927 to 1934, and the Senate from 1934 to 1937.

Turbay served as the Foreign Minister of Colombia from 1937 to 1938. He then served as Colombia's Ambassador to the United States from 1939 to 1945. He was opposed to the creation of Israel.

Turbay ran unsuccessfully for president in 1946.

Death
Turbay died on November 17, 1947, in Paris, France.

References

1901 births
1947 deaths
Colombian people of Lebanese descent
People from Bucaramanga
National University of Colombia alumni
Presidential Designates of Colombia
Members of the Chamber of Representatives of Colombia
Members of the Senate of Colombia
Foreign ministers of Colombia
Ambassadors of Colombia to the United States
Colombian Liberal Party politicians